Carrozzeria Garavini was an Italian coachbuilding company based in Turin, Italy.

History 
The Carrozzeria Garavini was founded in Turin in 1908 by Eusebio Garavini under the name "Carrozzeria Piemonte".

Eusebio Garavini was born in 1881. In 1899 he was working for Diatto company. In 1908 he managed to tie co-work agreement with Diatto. In the first years of activity he set up exclusively the frames produced by the Diatto and soon the two companies merged into the "Diatto and Garavini". In 1914 the "Garavini SA" was born, followed by the "Garavini Carrozzeria Stabilimenti" in 1933.

The company suffered massive damages during the First World War, but managed to build some luxury cars for Itala, Isotta Fraschini, Alfa Romeo, Fiat, OM and Bugatti, as well as numerous ambulances and buses.

In 1927, Garavini patented the "Pluemelastica" and "Plumacciaio" systems, a valid alternative to the famous patent "Weyman elastic body", to solve the problem of the poor rigidity of the frames that, also because of the bad roads, urged the bodywork to the point of injury. It was therefore necessary to anchor the body in an elastic way, also reducing the noise level.

In 1947 Aldo Garavini took over the company after his father's death.  Concetrating for buses and despite recognition, orders and awards the Viberti and Garavani stop its work in 1958.

Main car models by Garavini 

Alfa Romeo 6C 1750
Alfa Romeo 6C 1750 Saloon
Alfa Romeo 6C 1750 Spider Albatros
Alfa Romeo 6C 1750 Sport Bateau
Alfa Romeo 6C 2500
Alfa Romeo 8C 2300
Diatto Tipo 30
Fiat 500
Fiat 508
Fiat 508 Balilla
Fiat 510
Fiat 514 Victoria
Fiat 521
Fiat 525
Isotta Fraschini Tipo 8
Itala Tipo 50
Itala Model 61
Lancia Appia
Lancia Artena
Lancia Astura
Lancia Augusta
Rolls-Royce New Phantom
Rapid Coupé

References

External links 

Coachbuilders of Italy
Turin motor companies
Vehicle manufacturing companies established in 1908